A civilization state, or civilizational state, is a country that represents not just a historical territory, ethnolinguistic group, or body of governance, but a unique civilization in its own right. It is distinguished from the concept of a nation state by describing a country's dominant sociopolitical modes as constituting a category larger than a single nation. When classifying states as civilization states, emphasis is often placed on a country's historical continuity and cultural unity across a large geographic region.

The term was first coined in the 1990s as a way to describe China, but has also been used to describe nations such as Egypt, Russia, India, Turkey, and the United States.

The term has been popularized by Bruno Maçães in a series of essays since 2018.

China as a civilization state
The term "civilization-state" was first used by American political scientist Lucian Pye in 1990 to categorize China as having a distinct sociopolitical character, as opposed to viewing it as a nation state in the European model. The use of this new term implies that China was and still is an "empire state" with a unique political tradition and governmental structure, and its proponents asserted that the nation state model fails to properly describe the evolution of the Chinese state. Proponents of the label describe China as having a unique historical and cultural unity, derived from a continuous process of cultural syncretism. The term was further popularized by its use in When China Rules the World by British political scientist Martin Jacques.

According to Li Xing and Timothy M. Shaw, the central feature of analyzing China as a civilization state is the view that the Chinese state derives its legitimacy from the continuation of a sociopolitical order which posits that the state maintains natural authority over its subjects, and that it is the "guardian" of both its citizens and their society, a view of the state that is completely distinct from the Westphalian nation-state model. Other scholars make the case that the key features of a civilization-state are the maintenance of an ethos of cultural unity despite displaying significant cultural diversity, across centuries of history and a large geographic space. Some specifically draw attention to the longevity of the Chinese writing system, or describe China's existence as being uniquely and inexorably tied to the past.

Guang Xia pushes back on the idea of the uniqueness of a Chinese civilization-state. Xia argues that civilization-state discourse in China studies is an important and positive development, as it allows for characteristics of the modern Chinese state to be properly analyzed in the context of their history. However, Xia concludes that ultimately, all civilizations must reinvent themselves in the context of their history, and that it is a mistake to view China as a static entity or to portray it as being more tied to its past than the rest of the world.

Other proposed civilization states

Egypt 
By creating a civilizational continuation between ancient Egypt and contemporary Egypt with its Muslim characteristics, Egypt is another example of a civilization state that centers its continuous historical and cultural identity and tradition that contrast the West's global cultural dominance.

India 
India has been proposed as an example of a civilization state, with political commentators arguing that a shared Indian identity predates British colonization and Islamic invasions.

Russia 

Vladimir Putin's administration has at times embraced the rhetoric of portraying Russia as a distinct Eurasian civilization-state.

Further analysis

Criticisms of civilization states 
British journalist Gideon Rachman argued in a 2019 article that the concept of a civilization state is at odds with modern conceptions of universal human rights and common democratic standards, and is inherently exclusive to minority groups who do not share the feature(s) that define a particular civilization state (for example, they may have a different religion).

See also 
 Nation state
 Superstate
 Empire
 Tributary system of China
 Westphalian sovereignty
 Lucian Pye
 Zhang Weiwei and his 2011 book The China Wave: Rise of a Civilizational State
 Imperialism
 Cradle of civilization

References

Citations 
 Zhang Weiwei 2012. The China Wave: Rise of a Civilizational State. Singapore: World Scientific Publishing. https://doi.org/10.1142/u001

External links 
  by Kraut – Mentions Chinese civilization state (during marked time stamp).
Podcast about Christopher Coker's book The Rise of the Civilizational State (Polity Press, 2019)

Civilizations
Society of China
Geopolitical terminology
Political science terminology